George Ness Falkenstein' (July 16, 1859 – August 17, 1949) is a former president of Elizabethtown College.

Formative years
Born in York County, Pennsylvania on July 16, 1859, George Ness Falkenstein was a son of David Falkenstein and Mary (Ness) Falkenstein. Following his father's death in 1866, George Falkenstein took a job with a local grain mill to help support his mother and siblings. The money he earned there also enabled him to pursue a formal education via attendance at the York County Academy, the Brethren Normal School (known today as Juniata College), and Oberlin College.

Academic career
Following his graduation from Oberlin, Falkenstein relocated west in order to accept teaching positions in Kansas and Illinois. He also supported himself as a wheat farmer and harvester. He subsequently returned east, married Eva Shellenberger, and launched a business venture with her in Kansas. When it failed, he returned to teaching; however, his job-security was compromised when a blizzard forced the closure of the school in 1888; a tornado then damaged his family's home later that same year. Briefly employed as a member of the science faculty at Mount Morris College, he packed up his family and moved east again in 1893 in order to accept a position as a minister with the Church of the Brethren in Germantown, Pennsylvania, where he remained until 1900. As the new century dawned, he then became involved in the planning of a new academic institution - Elizabethtown College, and moved his family west to become a staff member and then, in 1901 and 1902, the college's president.

Death and interment
Falkenstein died in Pennsylvania on August 17, 1949, and was interred at Bupps Union Cemetery in Seven Valleys, York County.

References

Presidents of Elizabethtown College
1859 births
1949 deaths